Meghna state guest house  is an official guest house of the government of Bangladesh for visiting dignitaries and holding official meetings and is located in Ramna Thana, Dhaka.

History
In 2016 the EU Parliament International Trade Committee Chairman Bernd Lange, led a delegation of the EU parliament and met with the commerce minister of Bangladesh, Tofail Ahmed, in the guest house.

See also
 Jamuna State Guest House

References

Buildings and structures in Dhaka
Official residences in Bangladesh
Prime ministerial residences
Palaces in Bangladesh